The 2009 SaskTel Tankard (Saskatchewan's men's provincial curling championship) was held February 4–8 at the Meadow Lake Curling Club in Meadow Lake, Saskatchewan. The winning team, skipped by Joel Jordison, represented Saskatchewan at the 2009 Tim Hortons Brier in Calgary.

Teams

Draw Brackets

A Event

B Event

C Event

Results

Draw 1
February 4, 1500

Draw 2
February 4, 1900

Draw 3
February 5, 0830

Draw 4
February 5, 1500

Draw 5
February 5, 1900

Draw 6
February 6, 0830

Draw 7
February 6, 1200

Draw 8
February 6, 1600

Draw 9
February 6, 2000

Draw 10
February 7, 0900

Draw 11
February 7, 1400

Playoffs

C1 vs. C2
February 7, 1900

A vs. B
February 7, 1900

Semi-final
February 8, 0930

Final
February 8, 1400

External links
Official site
Meadow Lake Curling Club

Sasktel Tankard, 2009
Meadow Lake, Saskatchewan
2009 in Saskatchewan
Curling in Saskatchewan